The 1995 FA Charity Shield (also known as the Littlewoods Pools FA Charity Shield for sponsorship reasons)  was the 73rd FA Charity Shield, an annual football match played between the winners of the previous season's Premier League and FA Cup competitions. The match was played on 13 August 1995 at Wembley Stadium and contested by Blackburn Rovers, who had won the Premier League and FA Cup winners Everton. It was Blackburn's second successive Charity Shield appearance, while Everton were appearing in their eleventh and their first since 1987. Everton won the match 1–0 with a goal from Vinny Samways when he caught Tim Flowers off his line and lifted the ball over him from the left of the penalty area and into the right corner of the net. Dave Watson lifted the trophy for Everton, who have not won any competition since.

Match details

See also
1994–95 FA Premier League
1994–95 FA Cup

References

 

1995
Charity Shield 1995
Charity Shield 1995
Comm
Charity Shield